Gollings is a surname. Notable people with the surname include:

Ben Gollings (born 1980), British former rugby union player
John Gollings (born 1944), Australian architectural photographer 
Platt Gollings (1878–1935), British footballer 
Steve Gollings, British racehorse trainer